Frans Lanting (born 13 July 1951) is a Dutch National Geographic photographer, author and speaker.

Life
Lanting was born in Rotterdam in Netherlands. He studied economics at the Erasmus university in Rotterdam and later immigrated to the United States. He now lives in Santa Cruz, California, and operates a studio and gallery as well as a stock photography service. Lanting's wife Christine Eckstrom is a writer, editor, producer, and works on joint books of nature photography.

Lanting works in many different parts of the world, including the Amazon basin, Africa and Antarctica. His photographs are regularly published in National Geographic, where he served as photographer-in-residence.
He is also featured in Outdoor Photographer, Audubon, and Life. A 2005 exhibit in the Field Museum of Natural History, entitled Jungles, focused on the plants and animals of the rainforest.

Lanting's 2006 exhibit, Life: A Journey Through Time, part of the Cabrillo Festival of Contemporary Music in Santa Cruz, California, combined his photography with the music of Philip Glass. A traveling exhibition, Frans Lanting: LIFE began in fall 2006 at the Dutch natural history museum in Leiden, Netherlands. The show then traveled through Europe and the United States.

Lanting is a Fellow of the International League of Conservation Photographers (ILCP).

In August 2012, Lanting became an ambassador of the World Wide Fund for Nature in the Netherlands.
On 25 August 2012, a special concert version of LIFE was held in the Concertgebouw in Amsterdam celebrating 50 years of the World Wide Fund for Nature.

Exhibitions
29 May – 30 August 1998: "Eye in Eye", Natuurhistorisch Museum Rotterda
5 October 2000 – 14 January 2001: "Jungles", about tropical rainforest, Naturalis in Leiden
23 September 2006 – 2 September 2007: "LIFE", a journey through life, Naturalis in Leiden
 9 June – 4 September 2016: Solo exhibition: Dialogue with Nature, Netherlands Photo Museum in Rotterdam

Awards
 1988 – World Press Photo
 1989 – World Press Photo
 1991 – Wildlife Photographer of the Year
 1997 – Ansel Adams Award for Conservation Photography Award, Sierra Club
 1997 – 2nd prize Nature and Environment Stories, World Press Photo
 1999 – Lanting was awarded an Honorary Fellowship of The Royal Photographic Society in 1999. These are awarded to distinguished persons having, from their position or attainments, an intimate connection with the science or fine art of photography or the application thereof.
 2001 H.R.H. Prince Bernhard inducted him as a Knight in the Royal Order of the Golden Ark, the Netherlands' highest conservation honor.
 2005 – Lennart Nilsson Award
 2008 – Photographer of the Year, Photoimaging Manufacturers and Distributors Association
 2010 – The Royal Geographical Society's Cherry Kearton Medal and Award
 2021 – Art/Act Award from the David Brower Center

Awards
 2015 – WNF-Frans Lanting Award by World Wide Fund for Nature
 2018 – Wildlife Photographer of the Year Lifetime Achievement Award

Books
 1982 – Feathers
 1985 – Islands of the West
 1990 – The Albatrosses of Midway Island
 1990 – Madagascar, A World Out of Time
 1993 – Forgotten Edens, Exploring the World's Wild Places (with Christine Eckstrom)
 1993 – Okavango, Africa's Last Eden (with Christine Eckstrom)
 1996 – Animal Athletes
 1997 – Bonobo, The Forgotten Ape (with Frans de Waal)
 1997 – Eye to Eye, Intimate Encounters With the Animal World (with Christine Eckstrom)
 1999 – Living Planet, Preserving Edens of the Earth (with David Doubilet and Galen Rowell)
 2000 – Jungles (with Christine Eckstrom)
 2003 – Penguin (with Christine Eckstrom)
 2006 – LIFE, A Journey Through Time
 2017 – Into Africa
 2022 - Bay of Life: From Wind to Whales (with Christine Eckstrom)

See also
 Nature photography

References

External links

 
 
 "The story of life in photographs" (TED2005)

1951 births
Living people
20th-century Dutch photographers
21st-century Dutch photographers
Nature photographers
Artists from Rotterdam
Dutch expatriates in the United States
Sierra Club awardees
National Geographic photographers